Ranjith Kumar, popularly known as Ranjith Bajpe is an Indian film director and Screen Writer known for his work in Tulu cinema. He is best known for directing First International Tulu film Nirel (2014) which won 5 awards including the best movie award at Tulu Cinemotsava 2015. He also written directed Dhand (2015) which is the first Tulu language movie released in Israel Australia and UK. Ranjith Bajpe usually casts new actors for his movies.

Early life
Ranjith Bajpe was born on 9 December 1985, in Bajpe, in Dakshina Kannada district of Karnataka State. During his school days he acted in dramas and skits. His father's love of Yakshagana and brother's passion for drama contributed to his passion for movies. Currently working in Dubai, he is the only Tulu director who works on movies during annual leave of his company.

Filmography

List of Tulu Movies links
List of tulu films of 2016
List of tulu films of 2015
List of Tulu films of 2014
List of Released Tulu films
Tulu cinema
 Tulu Movie Actors
 Tulu Movie Actresses

References

External links

1979 births
Living people
Mangaloreans
Film directors from Karnataka
Tulu people
People from Dakshina Kannada district